Upfield railway station is the terminus of the suburban electrified Upfield line in Victoria, Australia. It serves the northern Melbourne suburb of Campbellfield, and it opened on 8 October 1889 as North Campbellfield. It closed on 13 July 1903, reopened on 5 March 1928, closed again on 5 May 1956, and was reopened again on 17 August 1959 as Upfield.

History

Upfield station originally opened on 8 October 1889, when the railway line from Coburg was extended to Somerton. It opened in its current form on 17 August 1959, when the line from Fawkner to Somerton was reopened and electrified. The name of the station comes from the area's open country at the time of its 1959 reopening.

During 1963-1964, the present station building was provided. In 1965, flashing light signals were provided at the Barry Road level crossing, located at the Up end of the station, with boom barriers provided later on in 1998, as part of the upgrade works along the Upfield line.

A train stabling yard, which was provided in 1997, is located north of the station. In 2011, an extra stabling siding (Siding "A") was provided.

During 2002-2003, the station was refurbished and, in December 2007, Upfield was upgraded to a Premium Station.

Under the PTV Network Development Plan, released in 2013, the section of the line between Upfield and Roxburgh Park would be reinstated, and would include a flyover over the North East standard gauge line. That would allow Seymour V/Line services to operate via Upfield, and would facilitate the eventual electrification of the line to Wallan.

In 1997, a signal panel was provided at the station. On 30 June 2019, it was abolished, with control transferred to Metrol.

Platforms and services

Upfield has one platform. It is serviced by Metro Trains' Upfield line services.

Platform 1:
  all stations services to Flinders Street

Transport links

Broadmeadows Bus Service operates two routes via Upfield station, under contract to Public Transport Victoria:
 : to North Coburg
 : Craigieburn station – Broadmeadows station

Dysons operates one route to and from Upfield station, under contract to Public Transport Victoria:
 : to Broadmeadows station

References

External links
 
 Melway map at street-directory.com.au

Premium Melbourne railway stations
Railway stations in Melbourne
Railway stations in Australia opened in 1889
Railway stations in the City of Hume